Oskar Krzyżak (born 24 January 2002) is a Polish professional footballer who plays as a centre-back for Skra Częstochowa, on loan from Raków Częstochowa.

Career statistics

Club

References

External links

2002 births
Living people
Sportspeople from Częstochowa
Polish footballers
Association football defenders
Raków Częstochowa players
Bytovia Bytów players
Skra Częstochowa players
III liga players
II liga players
I liga players
Ekstraklasa players
Poland youth international footballers